Giovanna Scotto (born Giovanna Margherita Piana-Canova; August 26, 1895 – December 23, 1985) was an Italian stage and film actress. She also became a prominent voice actress, dubbing foreign films for release in the Italian market.

Selected filmography
 Ragazzo (1934)
 The Two Sergeants (1936)
 The Former Mattia Pascal (1937)
 The Brambilla Family Go on Holiday (1941)
 The Ten Commandments (1945)
 Two Anonymous Letters (1945)
 Desire (1946)
 Flying Squadron (1949)
 Red Seal (1950)
 Black Fire (1951)
 Operation Mitra (1951)
 Sunday Heroes (1952)

References

Bibliography 
 Verdone, Luca. I film di Alessandro Blasetti. Gremese Editore, 1989.

External links 
 

1895 births
1985 deaths
Actors from Turin
Italian stage actresses
Italian film actresses
Italian voice actresses
20th-century Italian actresses